The 1788 United States House of Representatives elections in South Carolina were held on November 24 and 25, 1788 to select five Representatives for two-year terms from the state of South Carolina.  The elections resulted in two candidates in support of Washington's administration and three candidates opposed to his policies.

1st congressional district
William L. Smith defeated two candidates in the first election of the 1st congressional district, known as the Charleston District.

2nd congressional district
Aedanus Burke defeated Robert Barnwell in the first election of the 2nd congressional district, known as the Beaufort-Orangeburg District.

3rd congressional district
Daniel Huger won the first election of the 3rd congressional district, known as the Georgetown-Cheraw District.

4th congressional district
Thomas Sumter won the first election of the 4th congressional district, known as the Camden District.

5th congressional district
Thomas Tudor Tucker won the first election of the 5th congressional district, known as the Ninety-Six District.

See also
United States House of Representatives elections, 1789
South Carolina's congressional districts

References

1788
South Carolina
United States House of Representatives